Acrobasis caryalbella is a species of snout moth in the genus Acrobasis. It was described by Charles Russell Ely in 1913 and is known from the eastern United States.

There is one generation per year.

The larvae feed on Carya species, including Carya ovata, Carya tomentosa and Carya glabra. The species probably overwinters in the larval stage.

References

Moths described in 1913
Acrobasis
Moths of North America